The New York 36 is an American sailboat that was designed by William E. Cook as an International Offshore Rule (IOR), as well as a one design racer, which was first built in 1980.

Production
The design was built by W. D. Schock Corp in the United States, from 1980 until 1985, with 88 boats completed, but it is now out of production.

Design
The design came about as the result of some members of the New York Yacht Club (NYYC) asking Cook to design a boat specifically for one design racing at the club, but that would also be competitive in IOR handicap racing. Some of the production boats were sold to non-NYYC members on the US west coast.

Cook based the boat on his 1980 IOR One Ton class racer Firewater. The New York 36 used a taller mast for the lighter wind conditions found on western Long Island Sound, where it was anticipated the design would be raced and a cruising interior.

The New York 36 is a racing keelboat, built predominantly of fiberglass, with wood trim. It has a fractional sloop rig, a raked stem, a sharply reverse transom, an internally mounted spade-type rudder controlled by a tiller and a fixed fin keel. It displaces  and carries  of ballast.

The design has sleeping accommodation for six people, with a double "V"-berth in the bow cabin, a "U"-shaped settee and two aft quarter berths in the main cabin. The galley is located on the port side amidships. The galley is "L"-shaped and is equipped with a two-burner stove, icebox and a sink. A navigation station is opposite the galley, on the starboard side. The head is located just aft of the bow cabin on the port side and includes a shower.

Operational history
At the NYYC the design was raced as part of the annual NYYC Cruise throughout the 1980s.

Some of the production boats that were sold to non-NYYC members on the US west coast were raced as a one design class there for a period of time.

See also
List of sailing boat types

References

Keelboats
1980s sailboat type designs
Sailing yachts
Sailboat type designs by William E. Cook
Sailboat types built by W. D. Schock Corp